Sean Murray is an American composer, who has composed for numerous films, television shows and video games, such as God, the Devil and Bob (2000), starring Alan Cumming, James Garner and French Stewart, Art Heist (2004), Buffy the Vampire Slayer (1997), True Crime: Streets of LA (2003), Call of Duty: World at War (2008), and the record selling game Call of Duty: Black Ops (2010).

Biography
Sean grew up in Santa Barbara, California, where he attended the Brooks Institute Film School. There he began studying film composing, by contributing music to dozens of student movies. Sean debuted as a composer when he was a teenager for the action film Scorpion.

Discography

Films

1990s

2000s

2010s

2020s

Television

Video games

Personal life
Sean is the son of actor Don Murray, who was nominated for an Academy Award in the 1956 comedy film Bus Stop. Sean also has two brothers, Christopher and Mick Murray. He lives in Hollywood Hills with his wife and daughter.

References

External links

Featured on Cakewalk website.

Living people
1965 births
American film score composers
Video game composers
Buffy the Vampire Slayer
21st-century American composers
American television composers